Akonangui Fútbol Club is an Equatoguinean football club based in the city of Ebebiyín.

It was dissolved in 2010, but returned for the 2012 season in Second Division, ascending to First Division next year.

Honours

Domestic
Equatoguinean Primera División: 5
1992, 1999, 2001, 2008, 2013.

Equatoguinean Cup: 5
1979, 1996, 2002, 2007, 2019.

Performance in CAF competitions
CAF Champions League: 1 appearance
2022 - First Round

Notable players

References

 
Association football clubs disestablished in 2010
2010 disestablishments in Equatorial Guinea
Ebibeyin